The 1971 Amstel Gold Race (held Sunday March 28, 1971) was the sixth edition of the annual road bicycle race "Amstel Gold Race".  It was held in the Dutch provinces of Limburg.

The race stretched 233 kilometres, starting in Heerlen and finishing in Meerssen. There were a total of 123 competitors, and 47 cyclists finished the race.

Result

References

External links
Results

Amstel Gold Race
1971 in road cycling
1971 in Dutch sport